Daniel Ruiz Posadas (born 28 June 1995) is a Spanish volleyball player for CV 7 Islas and the Spanish national team.

He participated at the 2017 Men's European Volleyball Championship.

References

1995 births
Living people
Spanish men's volleyball players